Samay Raina is an Indian stand-up comedian, YouTuber, and chess enthusiast. He was the co-winner of the second season of the stand-up comedy contest Comicstaan. During the COVID-19 pandemic, he began streaming chess games along with multiple comedians and chess masters. He has raised substantial amounts of money for various causes through his YouTube channel, including help for waste pickers, and relief for West Bengal and Assam flood victims.

Early life and education 
Raina was born in Jammu city of Jammu and Kashmir into a conservative Kashmiri Pandit family. He enrolled in a print engineering course at Vidhyarthi Griha in Pune, Maharashtra which he said was a waste of time, and started doing open mic events and eventually became a regular in the local comedy scene.

Career

Stand-up
After performing at multiple open mics since 27 August 2017, Raina began opening for well-known comedians like Anirban Dasgupta and Abhishek Upmanyu in Pune. As he gained recognition, he moved to Mumbai to pursue a career in stand-up comedy and gave several successful shows in Mumbai and several cities across the nation.

Comicstaan 2

Eventually, he joined Comicstaan 2 from a suggestion from his co-winner Aakash Gupta. Later, he became the joint winner of Comicstaan 2 with Aakash Gupta, aired on Amazon Prime Video.

YouTube 
During the COVID-19 pandemic, the government cancelled all outdoor events, and thus, Raina could no longer perform stand-up comedy. He then began streaming chess games on his YouTube channel at the fellow comedian Tanmay Bhat's suggestion. His viewership boosted when he invited YouTuber Antonio Radić, popularly known as Agadmator, to his channel. In response to this, Indian GM Vidit Gujrathi tweeted that he would like to join Raina on his track. Eventually, Gujrathi appeared on Raina's channel, giving another boost to Raina's viewership. Since then, the two have fostered a strong relationship and frequently feature on each other's channels. Gujrathi attributes his moving from Twitch to YouTube to Raina's suggestion.

According to many chess proponents, including GMs Viswanathan Anand, Vidit Gujrathi, Anish Giri, Teimour Radjabov, Baskaran Adhiban, Emil Sutovsky and IMs Tania Sachdev and Sagar Shah, Raina has been instrumental in popularising chess in India through his channel. Raina tries to make the game of chess more appealing to the masses through his humour which, according to many, has helped him reach a larger audience.

Several well-known chess personalities like Pentala Harikrishna, Judit Polgár, former world chess champions Vladimir Kramnik, Viswanathan Anand and the current world chess champion Magnus Carlsen have appeared on Raina's channel. He also organized chess tournaments featuring Indian celebrities such as cricketer Yuzvendra Chahal.

In addition to chess, he also live streams many other games on his YouTube channel.

Chess 
, Raina has a rating of 1688 at rapid chess on chess.com, while the highest recorded rating was 1872. On 5 May 2021, Raina won the $10,000 Botez Bullet Invitational, a one-hour amateur bullet arena tournament sponsored by Chess.com and hosted by the Botez sisters. He was the only Indian streamer competing among some of the top international Twitch streamers and earned $4000.

Comedians on Board (COB) 
He started organizing online chess tournaments on his channel to attract the online audience to chess, called Comedians On Board (COB), inviting many of his comedian friends and other celebrities.

Chess Super League (CSL) 
Raina with ChessBase India and Nodwin Gaming organized an online chess league called Chess Super League consisting of some of the Top International and Indian Grandmasters, International Masters and Indian Junior Players, competing in six teams of six players each. The entire event was streamed on Raina's YouTube Channel.

Filmography

References

External links 
 

Living people
Kashmiri Pandits
Indian stand-up comedians
Indian male comedians
Indian YouTubers
Year of birth missing (living people)
YouTube channels launched in 2013